Bishopscourt may refer to:

Places

Australia
 Bishopscourt, East Melbourne, a gothic architecture building in East Melbourne, Victoria, Australia
 Bishopscourt, Darling Point, a historic house in Sydney, Australia

Ireland
 Bishopscourt, County Kildare, the former seat of the Earls of Clonmell in County Kildare, Ireland
 Bishopscourt, Straffan, the home of Irish politician John Ponsonby, located in Straffan, Ireland
 Bishopscourt Racing Circuit, a motor racing track in County Down, Northern Ireland

Isle of Man
 Bishopscourt, Isle of Man, a mansion house, chapel and estate on the Isle of Man, United Kingdom

New Zealand
 Bishopscourt, Dunedin, a historic property in Dunedin, New Zealand, built by William Mason

South Africa
 Bishopscourt, Cape Town, a southern suburb of Cape Town, South Africa

See also
 Bishop Court Apartments
 Bishops' Court